Maximilian Foidl (born 8 October 1995) is an Austrian cross-country mountain biker. He competed in the cross-country race at the 2020 Summer Olympics, finishing 17th overall.

Major results
2017
 1st  National Under-23 XCO Championships
2018
 2nd National XCO Championships
2020
 2nd National XCO Championships
2021
 1st  National XCO Championships

References

External links

1995 births
Living people
Austrian male cyclists
Austrian mountain bikers
Cross-country mountain bikers
Olympic cyclists of Austria
Cyclists at the 2020 Summer Olympics